Yerville is a commune in the Seine-Maritime department in the Normandy region in northern France.

Geography
The A29 autoroute forms the southern border of the commune's territory.

Heraldry

Population

Places of interest
 The church of Notre-Dame, dating from the nineteenth century.
 Ruins of the sixteenth-century chateau of Thibermesnil.

See also
Communes of the Seine-Maritime department

References

Communes of Seine-Maritime